Bedell Crossing is an unincorporated village in Kittery, York County, Maine, United States.

Notes

Villages in York County, Maine
Kittery, Maine